Paul Cavonis (born December 4, 1937) is an American actor who has appeared in over 30 movies and television series. Cavonis is known for playing mafia and Greek characters.

Early life
Cavonis was born in the Hells Kitchen section of Manhattan in New York City. He is of Greek ancestry. He was drafted and served in the United States Army in the period between the Korean War and the full-scale escalation of the Vietnam War. Cavonis has said jokingly about his service in the Army that, “Not one Viet Cong soldier invaded Hawaii on my watch.”

Career 1970s
Cavonis's first TV appearance was as Mickey in the 1972 made-for-TV movie The Living End starring Lou Gossett Jr. He next appeared as Rick Niels in the award nominated made-for-TV movie Short Walk to Daylight alongside James Brolin. Throughout the 1970s Cavonis made appearances in the Brady Bunch, Six Million Dollar Man, S.W.A.T., Kojak, The F.B.I., Banacek, The Bionic Woman, Baretta, The Rockford Files, Police Story, and Rhoda. Cavonis had a recurring role on The Streets of San Francisco, multiple roles in Charlie's Angels and M*A*S*H, and appeared in the episode "A Hand For Sonny Blue" from the 1977 series Quinn Martin's Tales of the Unexpected (known in the United Kingdom as Twist in the Tale).

Career 1980s
Cavonis made appearances on The Greatest American Hero, Fantasy Island, The Fall Guy, Matt Houston, T. J. Hooker, and Dynasty.

Career 1990s
Cavonis made a cameo in Pablo Ferro's 1992 JoBeth Williams-George Segal romantic comedy Me, Myself & I.

Retirement
Cavonis is retired and is now the mayor of a retirement community in the Wine Country near north San Diego County in Southern California.

References

External links
 

1937 births
Living people
People from Hell's Kitchen, Manhattan
American people of Greek descent
Male actors from New York (state)
American male film actors
American male television actors